Sunday Afolabi may refer to:
 Sunday Afolabi (politician)
 Sunday Afolabi (footballer)